Oximide is an unstable chemical compound, the cyclic imide of oxalic acid. Other names for this are the systematic name 2,3-Aziridinedione or oxalimide. The chemical formula is C2HNO2. Its core is a three member heterocycle, aziridine.

Production
In 1886 Ost and Mente claimed to produce oximide by the reaction of oxamic acid with phosphorus pentachloride (PCl5). However, a product with a six member ring, tetraketopiperazine, may have been produced instead. Later attempts to reproduce the production of oximide by this method were a failure. The first successful manufacture of oximide was by Hiromu Aoyama, Masami Sakamoto, and Yoshimori Omote in 1980.

Properties
Aziridine-2,3-dione has an infrared absorption band at 1954 cm−1.

Related
The term "oximide" has also been used for oximes.

Derivatives of oximide exist where the hydrogen atom is substituted by other organic groups such as methyl or phenyl. When 4-methyl-1,2,4-triazolinedione is irradiated by ultraviolet light with wavelength 335 nm in a noble gas matrix, some methylaziridine-2,3-dione is made (along with isocyanates, carbon monoxide and dinitrogen). Similarly 4-phenyl-1,2,4-triazolinedione irradiated by ultraviolet light with wavelength 310 nm makes some phenylaziridine-2,3-dione. Shorter wavelength ultraviolet light decomposes these compounds to isocyanates (-NCO).

Another method to produce oximide derivatives is by the photolysis of substituted diphenylmaleylimide ozonide at liquid nitrogen temperature (77K) in a potassium bromide matrix.  Derivatives made this way are methyl, isopropyl and phenylethyl-aziridine-2,3-dione. These compounds are unstable at higher temperatures, and when heated, decompose to carbon monoxide and isocyanates.

References

Heterocyclic compounds with 1 ring
Diketones
Imides
Nitrogen heterocycles
Three-membered rings
Substances discovered in the 1980s